Axamer Lizum is a village and ski resort in Austria, located southwest of Innsbruck in the state of Tyrol. At the 1964 Winter Olympics, it hosted five of the six alpine skiing events: women's downhill, and men's and women's slalom and giant slalom. Men's downhill was held at Patscherkofel. Twelve years later in 1976, it hosted exactly the same alpine skiing events.

The ski area is well known for a large variety of options to ski or snowboard off the marked piste. The highest location of the ski area is the mountain Hoadl with an altitude of 2,340 m, which is relatively high for a ski area in this region of the Alps. Thus, the Axamer Lizum has a reputation to be among the last (non glacier-based) ski resorts in the north of Tyrol which have sufficient snow for winter sport at the end of winter.

References
1964 Winter Olympics official report. pp. 78, 82–85. 
1976 Winter Olympics official report. pp. 198–201. 
Official website 
Official website - Winter. 
Ski and snowboard in Axamer Lizum. 
Alpine Ski Maps - Innsbruck - winter

Venues of the 1964 Winter Olympics
Venues of the 1976 Winter Olympics
Olympic alpine skiing venues
Sports venues in Austria
Cities and towns in Innsbruck-Land District